"Making Memories" is a song originally recorded by Frankie Laine in 1967. It became a U.S. Top 40 hit, reaching #35, and an Easy Listening hit, peaking at #2.

Chart history

References

External links
 Lyrics of this song
 

1967 songs
1967 singles
Frankie Laine songs
ABC Records singles
Songs with lyrics by Larry Kusik